The Nou Palau Blaugrana will be a multi-sports indoor arena, located in Barcelona, Catalonia, Spain. The arena will serve as the new home arena for the basketball (FC Barcelona Bàsquet), handball (FC Barcelona Handbol) and Futsal (FC Barcelona Futsal) sections of the multi-sports club FC Barcelona. The Nou Palau Blaugrana will have a maximum capacity of 15,000 spectators.

It will be built on the site currently occupied by the Mini Estadi, which was demolished in 2020 after the construction of the Estadi Johan Cruyff which was completed and inaugurated in 2019. Construction on the new arena is scheduled to begin in 2024 and finish in 2026, and will replace the original Palau Blaugrana, which is across the street and currently serves as the home arena for FC Barcelona's basketball, handball, and futsal teams.

The project is part of the Espai Barça project.

See also
 List of indoor arenas in Spain

References

Proposed indoor arenas
Proposed buildings and structures in Spain
Sports venues in Barcelona
Basketball venues in Spain
FC Barcelona Bàsquet
FC Barcelona Handbol
Indoor arenas in Catalonia
Indoor arenas in Spain
Handball venues in Spain